Stenocercus albolineatus is a species of lizard of the Tropiduridae family. It is found in Brazil.

References

Stenocercus
Reptiles described in 2015
Endemic fauna of Brazil
Reptiles of Brazil